Sitaram Yadav may refer to:

 Sitaram Yadav (politician, born 1946)
 Sitaram Yadav (politician, born 1952)